"The Sphinx" is a song by French singer Amanda Lear released in 1978 by Ariola Records as the single from her third album Never Trust a Pretty Face.

Song information 
The song was composed and produced by Anthony Monn, and marked a change in Lear's repertoire as her first downtempo disco ballad. The melancholic Lear-penned lyrics, in which the singer compares herself to the mythical Sphinx, tell about "the desire to remain a mystery". The singer has reflected that "The Sphinx" is the best song she wrote.

"The Sphinx" was released as the advance single from the singer's third studio album Never Trust a Pretty Face in late 1978. The single B-side was "Hollywood Flashback", the closing track on her previous album, Sweet Revenge. The song was a moderate chart success, reaching the top 20 across Europe, and remains one of Lear's biggest hits of the disco era.

Lear re-recorded the song for the 1998 album Back in Your Arms, and included the new version on her greatest hits compilation Forever Glam! in 2005.

Track listing 
7" Single
A. "The Sphinx" – 4:25
B. "Hollywood Flashback" – 4:31

12" Single
A. "The Sphinx" – 5:13
B. "Hollywood Flashback" – 4:31

Chart performance

Cover versions 
 Spanish singer Pedro Marín covered the song on his 2006 Amanda Lear tribute album Diamonds.
 In 2015, Chilean-American musician Promis released a cover of the song on his collaboration album Sunset Blvd with producer Ian Matthews. The song was released as the single in spring 2016.

References 

1978 singles
1978 songs
Amanda Lear songs
Disco songs
Ariola Records singles
1970s ballads
Songs written by Amanda Lear
Songs written by Anthony Monn
Sphinxes